Alexandru Cicâldău (born 8 July 1997) is a Romanian professional footballer who plays as a midfielder for UAE Pro League club Ittihad Kalba, on loan  from Süper Lig club Galatasaray, and the Romania national team.

He started his career as a senior at Viitorul Constanța, and in the summer of 2018 transferred to Universitatea Craiova. Cicâldău totalled over 100 games in the league championship and won two domestic trophies with the latter, before moving abroad to Galatasaray in 2021.

Internationally, Cicâldau registered his full debut for Romania in a 2–1 friendly defeat of Israel in March 2018. The following year, he started in all games for the under-21 side as they reached the semi-finals of the European Championship.

Club career

Early career / Viitorul Constanța
Cicâldău was raised in Satu Nou, a village near Medgidia, Constanța County, and started practising football at the age of eight. After initially playing at Marcon Star Medgidia, he joined the Gheorghe Hagi Academy, which served as the youth setup of Viitorul Constanța.

Cicâldău made his debut in the first division for Viitorul on 31 March 2016, aged 18, in a 1–1 away draw at ASA Târgu Mureș. He became a regular starter for the club in the 2017–18 season, amassing 38 appearances and one goal in all competitions.

Universitatea Craiova
On 6 July 2018, Cicâldău agreed to a four-year contract with Universitatea Craiova, being assigned the number 10 shirt. Press reported the fee at figures between €750,000 and €1 million plus interest. He made his first appearance for "the White-Blues" eight days later, playing the full match as CFR Cluj won 1–0 in the Supercupa României.

Cicâldău netted his first goal in a 3–0 league win over Astra Giurgiu, on 26 October. On 31 March 2019, he scored a header in a 2–3 away loss to title contenders FCSB. He recorded his first goal in European competitions on 18 July that year, opening a 3–2 home victory over Sabail in the second leg of the UEFA Europa League first qualifying round. After prolonged speculation regarding offers from foreign teams, in September he signed a contract extension which would have ran until 2025.

On 31 January 2020, in the opening game of the calendar year, Cicâldau scored twice before half-time in a 3–1 defeat of Gaz Metan Mediaș; the second goal came from a free kick and the double was the first in his professional career. On 28 June, he scored the winner in a 3–2 away victory over two-time defending champions CFR Cluj, and two fixtures later converted a penalty in a 2–1 win against FCSB. Cicâldau ended the Liga I season with 14 goals, as Craiova lost the league title to CFR in the last home game.

During the 2020–21 season, Cicâldau amassed 12 goals from 42 appearances in all competitions, and won his first national cup after a 3–2 victory over Astra Giurgiu in the final. On 10 July 2021, he started in the 4–2 penalty shoot-out win over CFR Cluj in the subsequent Supercupa României.

Galatasaray
On 24 July 2021, Cicâldău joined Turkish club Galatasaray on a five-year deal in a transfer worth €6.5 million plus €2 million in bonuses. He made his debut on 16 August, in a 2–0 Süper Lig defeat of Giresunspor in which he converted a penalty. On 16 September, he played his first European match for the team in a 1–0 home victory over Lazio in the Europa League group stage.

On 25 October 2021, Cicâldău opened the scoring in a 1–2 derby loss to reigning champions Beşiktaş at Vodafone Park. One month later, he netted and provoked an own goal in the first half of a 4–2 Europa League defeat of Marseille. On 17 March 2022, he assisted Galatasaray's only goal in a 1–2 loss to Barcelona in the round of 16 of the same competition.

Loan to Ittihad Kalba
On 27 August 2022, Cicâldău was loaned out to the Emirati club Ittihad Kelba for one season.

International career
Cicâldău received his first call up for the Romania senior team in March 2018. On the 24th that month, he made his debut as an 83rd-minute substitute in a friendly with Israel, which his team won 2–1. His first official game for the country came on 17 November, in a 3–0 UEFA Nations League defeat of Lithuania.

The following year he represented the under-21 side at the 2019 UEFA European Championship, where they managed to progress past a group with Croatia, England and France, before being eliminated by defending champions Germany in the semi-finals. He earned four caps during the final tournament, all as a starter.

After the conclusion of the Under-21 Championship, Cicâldău continued to be selected for the senior team. On 31 March 2021, on his twelfth cap, he scored his first goals in a 2–3 away loss to Armenia counting for the 2022 FIFA World Cup qualifiers.

Style of play
Cicâldău is capable of aiding his teammates in both defense and attack, being described as a box-to-box midfielder by former Romanian international Gheorghe Craioveanu. He has been praised for his technique and work ethic.

Career statistics

Club

International

Scores and results list Romania's goal tally first, score column indicates score after each Cicâldău goal.

Honours
Viitorul Constanța
Liga I: 2016–17
Supercupa României runner-up: 2017

Universitatea Craiova
Cupa României: 2020–21
Supercupa României: 2021; runner-up: 2018

Individual
Liga I Team of the Season: 2018–19, 2019–20, 2020–21
Gazeta Sporturilor Romania Player of the Month: November 2021

References

External links

1997 births
Living people
People from Medgidia
Romanian footballers
Association football midfielders
Liga I players
FC Viitorul Constanța players
CS Universitatea Craiova players
Süper Lig players
Galatasaray S.K. footballers
UAE Pro League players
Al-Ittihad Kalba SC players
Romania youth international footballers
Romania under-21 international footballers
Romania international footballers
Romanian expatriate footballers
Expatriate footballers in Turkey
Romanian expatriate sportspeople in Turkey
Expatriate footballers in the United Arab Emirates
Romanian expatriate sportspeople in the United Arab Emirates